Bhanumati Gari Mogudu is a 1987 Indian Telugu-language comedy film, produced by D. V. S. Raju under the D.V.S. Enterprises banner and directed by A. Kodandarami Reddy. It stars Nandamuri Balakrishna, Vijayashanti, and music composed by Chakravarthy. Kalaimani, writer of this film directed Tamil remake of the film Therkathi Kallan (1988).

Plot
The film begins in a village where Jaya Krishna an intrepid, and Gowri a prankish girl tries to charm him. Jaya Krishna's farm upholding his grandfather's sepulcher is about squatting. So, Jaya Krishna aims to acquire the plot and proceeds to the city. Besides, Bhanumati a vainglory feminist who always fracas and forbids the wedding. Plus, she continues cross-swords against 4 scapegraces that hold high esteem. Jaya Krishna's path moves to Bhanumati with a squabble. Fortuitously, Jaya Krishna turns into a stuntman and starts earning.

As of today, Bhanumati's obstinacy hikes day by day when she alerts that as stated in her father's testament she will not obtain the wealth until her nuptials. Wherefore, she is perturbed when her advocate Kodal Rao gives the sense of a forge knit hiring a nameless. Forthwith, Bhanumati is forayed by the 4 wicked when she is guarded by Jaya Krishna. Bhanumathi is aware of his must and leases him as her husband. Bhanumati's sibling Raghava and his wife Rani couple the two via registered marriage. After a series of donnybrooks, Jaya Krishna is vexed with Bhanumati and is all set to quit. At that juncture, Raghava bars & feeds him that Bhanumati is officially his wife and he is the perfect chap to transform her. Therefrom, Jaya Krishna charges & taunts Bhanumati to get her along with him, and back to the village.

Presently, Bhanumati gets knowledge that her husband's authorization & approval is inevitable for any transaction. Hence, she intrigues to pick up the divorce and travel to his village. Accordingly, she designs diverse attempts and also seeks the aid of Gowri but in vain and it ends hilariously. After a while, 4 black-hearted again inroad on Bhanumati when she accidentally lands at a Police Station. As soon as, the 4 ruses turn around the case on Bhanumati. During that plight, Jaya Krishna arrives and proclaims her as his wife. Then, the Inspector behests the proof likewise Jaya Krishna ties the wedding chain to Bhanumati. As a result, soul-searching begins in her, desire to reach her husband that night Gowri shelters her. The next day, as startle Gowri is spotted as dead, and Bhanumati is incriminated. Here, Jaya Krishna finds something fishy and starts soon, he breaks the mystery by catching Baddikotu Pakir who entices Gowri. Indeed, that evening the 4 knaves bribed Pakir to snare Bhanumati and surrender to them. Simultaneously, Gowri is conscious that Bhanumati is backing bearing in mind her love. For that reason, she has forged ahead to knit Pakir. But he hoodwinked and handled out Gowri to heels who slain her in the chaos. At last, Jaya Krishna ceases the baddies and acquits Bhanumati who apologizes to her husband. Finally, the movie ends on a happy note with Bhanumati accompanying Jaya Krishna to their village.

Cast

Nandamuri Balakrishna as Jayakrishna 
Vijayashanti as Bhanumati
Aswini as Gowri
Ranganath as Inspector
Giri Babu as Raghava
Sudhakar as Baddikotu Pakir
Rajesh as Mukunda
Paruchuri Venteswara Rao as Director 
Nagesh as Lawyer Chinta Singinadham
Suthi Velu as Lawyer Kodal Rao
Ramana Reddy as Swamy
Mallikarjuna Rao as Sarpanch 
K. K. Sarma as Production Manager
Chidatala Appa Rao as Appa Rao
Jagga Rao as Subbaiah
P. J. Sarma as Public Prosecutor
Bhimeswara Rao as Bank Manager
Vankayala Satyanarayana as Public Prosecutor
Mucharlla Aruna as Rani 
Pushpalata as Jayakrishna's mother
Nirmalamma as Bhanumathi's aunt

Soundtrack

Music was composed by Chakravarthy, and lyrics were written by Veturi. Music was released by Saptaswar Audio Company.

References

External links
 

1987 films
Films directed by A. Kodandarami Reddy
Films scored by K. Chakravarthy
1980s Telugu-language films
Indian comedy-drama films
Films with screenplays by the Paruchuri brothers
Telugu films remade in other languages
1987 comedy-drama films